Vladimir Popović may refer to:

 Vladimir Popović (diplomat) (1914–1972), Yugoslav diplomat and politician
 Vladimir Popović (actor) (1935–1981), Montenegrin actor
 Vladimír Popovič (born 1939), Slovak painter
 Vladica Popović (born 1935), Yugoslav footballer who played in the 1962 FIFA World Cup
 Vladimir Popović (footballer, born 1976), former Montenegrin footballer
 Vladimir Popović (basketball) (born 1982), Serbian professional basketball player

See also  
 Popović

sk:Vladimír Popovič